Keith Collar Clark (November 21, 1927 – January 11, 2002) was a bugler in the United States Army who played the call "Taps" at the funeral of President John F. Kennedy in 1963. He misplayed the sixth note, and to many this mistake was a poignant symbol of the American nation in mourning. The bugle that Clark used is on display at the welcome center of Arlington National Cemetery.

Career 
As lead bugler of the United States Army Band when Kennedy was assassinated, Clark was assigned the task of playing Taps at the president's funeral. On the day of the funeral, Clark stood in the rain for three hours before it was time for him to play. At 3:08 pm, after the 21-gun salute, Clark started to play "Taps", and on the sixth note, briefly sounded the harmonic one higher than intended, "cracking" the note.

After the funeral, many assumed the mistake was intentional.

References

External links 
 
 

1927 births
2002 deaths
United States Army Band musicians
American male trumpeters
Deaths from aortic aneurysm
People associated with the assassination of John F. Kennedy
Musicians from Grand Rapids, Michigan
Military personnel from Michigan
United States Army soldiers
Burials at Arlington National Cemetery
20th-century American male musicians
United States Army personnel of World War II
United States Army personnel of the Korean War
United States Army personnel of the Vietnam War